Paul David Sanderson (born 28 July 1964) is an English former footballer who played as a winger in the Football League for Chester City, Halifax Town, Cardiff City and Walsall.

References

1964 births
Living people
Sportspeople from Blackpool
Association football wingers
English footballers
Fleetwood Town F.C. players
Manchester City F.C. players
Chester City F.C. players
Halifax Town A.F.C. players
Cardiff City F.C. players
Walsall F.C. players
Wycombe Wanderers F.C. players
Cheltenham Town F.C. players
Yeovil Town F.C. players
English Football League players